In the mathematical field of graph theory, the Dyck graph is a 3-regular graph with 32 vertices and 48 edges, named after Walther von Dyck.

It is Hamiltonian with 120 distinct Hamiltonian cycles. It has chromatic number 2, chromatic index 3, radius 5, diameter 5 and girth 6. It is also a 3-vertex-connected and a 3-edge-connected graph. It has book thickness 3 and queue number 2.

The Dyck graph is a toroidal graph, and the dual of its symmetric toroidal embedding is the Shrikhande graph, a strongly regular graph both symmetric and hamiltonian.

Algebraic properties
The automorphism group of the Dyck graph is a group of order 192. It acts transitively on the vertices, on the edges and on the arcs of the graph. Therefore, the Dyck graph is a symmetric graph. It has automorphisms that take any vertex to any other vertex and any edge to any other edge. According to the Foster census, the Dyck graph, referenced as F32A, is the only cubic symmetric graph on 32 vertices.

Dyck map
The Dyck graph is the skeleton of a symmetric tessellation of a surface of genus three by twelve octagons, known as the Dyck map or Dyck tiling. The dual graph for this tiling is the complete tripartite graph K4,4,4.

Gallery

References 

Individual graphs
Regular graphs